The Global Preparedness Monitoring Board (abbreviated GPMB) is a joint arm of the WHO and the World Bank. It was created by both organizations in response to the Western African Ebola virus epidemic.

Synopsis
The GPMB are concerned that "at any time, an emerging, lethal, and highly transmissible pathogen might pose a risk of being spread globally because of the interconnectedness of the global population."

Board members
As of December 2020 the GPMB listed its board members as:
 Elhadj As Sy, co-chair
 Gro Harlem Brundtland, co-chair
 Victor Dzau
 Chris Elias
 Jeremy Farrar
 Anthony S. Fauci
 Henrietta Fore
 George F. Gao
 Sigrid Kaag
 Ilona Kickbusch
 Ngamije M. Daniel
 Veronika Skvortsova
 Yasuhiro Suzuki
 Jeanette Vega Morales
 K. VijayRaghavan

Commentary
In April 2020, Boyd, Baker and Wilson remarked that the "WHO Global Preparedness Monitoring Board Report 2019 repeatedly notes widespread lack of preparedness for a significant pandemic".

Selected publications

References

World Health Organization
World Bank